Boronia mollis, commonly known as soft boronia, is a plant in the citrus family and is endemic to New South Wales. It is a shrub with pinnate leaves, and small groups of pink flowers in leaf axils. It grows in coastal areas in forest.

Description
The leaflets are usually glabrous on the upper surface and paler with a few hairs below. The leaves have an unpleasant citrus/bitumen type scent. The bases of the petals do not overlap. There are eight stamens, with those nearest the sepals longer than those near the petals and the anthers are yellow. Flowering occurs from June to November.

Taxonomy and naming
Boronia mollis was first formally described by John Lindley from an unpublished description by Allan Cunningham and the description was published in Edwards's Botanical Register. The original specimen was collected by the Nepean River in 1825. The specific epithet (mollis) is a Latin word meaning "soft", referring to the leaf, and the hairs on the stem.

Distribution and habitat
Soft boronia is a rare species that grows in dry eucalypt forest from the Kendall district to the Wollemi and Blue Mountains National Parks.

Use in horticulture
This is one of the hardier boronias and is popular in cultivation. It requires moist but well-drained soil, preferably in dappled shade.

References

External links

mollis
Flora of New South Wales
Plants described in 1841
Sapindales of Australia
Taxa named by Allan Cunningham (botanist)